Schreckensteinia felicella is a moth of the  family Schreckensteiniidae. It is found in western North America, including and possibly limited to California.

The wingspan is 10–12 mm.

The larvae feed on Castilleja affinis.

External links
mothphotographersgroup

Schreckensteinioidea